The 2015 World Judo Juniors Championships was an edition of the World Judo Juniors Championships, organised by the International Judo Federation. It was held in Abu Dhabi, United Arab Emirates from 23 to 27 October 2015. The final day of competition featured men's and women's team events, both won by team Japan.

Medal summary

Men's events

Women's events

Source Results

Medal table

References

External links
 

World Judo Junior Championships
 U21
World Championships, U21
World Championships, U21
Judo
World Championships 2015, Juniors
Judo
Judo, World Championships U21